Chennai Super Kings (CSK) is a franchise cricket team based in Chennai, Tamil Nadu, India, which has played in the Indian Premier League (IPL) since the first edition of the tournament in 2008.  They were one of ten teams to compete in the 2022 Indian Premier League. The Super Kings have previously lifted the IPL title four times (in 2010, 2011, 2018 and 2021) and were the defending champions in 2022.

The season was the first time since the inaugural season of the tournament that Suresh Raina was not a member of the team as he was not picked in the mega auction. Part way through the season Ravindra Jadeja resigned as the team's captain, with MS Dhoni, the side's long-term captain, taking back the position.

Background
The side retained four players ahead of the 2022 mega-auction.
Retained MS Dhoni, Ravindra Jadeja, Moeen Ali, Ruturaj Gaikwad.
Released Suresh Raina, Faf du Plessis, Mitchell Santner, Lungi Ngidi, Narayan Jagadeeshan, Shardul Thakur, Imran Tahir, Karn Sharma, Sam Curran, Josh Hazlewood, Ravisrinivasan Sai Kishore, Cheteshwar Pujara, Krishnappa Gowtham, Hari Nishanth, Bhagath Varma, Harishankar Reddy.
Acquired during the auction Dwayne Bravo, Robin Uthappa, Deepak Chahar, KM Asif, Ambati Rayudu, Tushar Deshpande, Devon Conway, Subhranshu Senapati, Chezhian Harinishanth, Shivam Dube, Rajvardhan Hangargekar, Dwaine Pretorius, Mitchell Santner, Narayan Jagadeesan, Maheesh Theekshana, Prashant Solanki, Simarjeet Singh, Adam Milne, Mukesh Choudhary, Chris Jordan, Bhagath Varma.

Squad 
 Players with international caps are listed in bold.

Administration and support staff

Kit manufacturers and sponsors

|

Season standings

Points table

Group stage 

The schedule for the group stages of IPL 2022 was published 7 March 2022.

Matches

Statistics

Most runs

References

Cricket teams in India
2022 Indian Premier League
Chennai Super Kings seasons